Guapimirim (from Tupi 'little spring', guapi 'spring', mirim 'little'), is a Brazilian Municipality in the state of Rio de Janeiro around 50km(31 miles) from its state capital, the city of Rio de Janeiro. Its in a region known as Baixada Fluminense and the Greater Rio de Janeiro metropolitan area.

The municipality is in the Serra dos Órgãos mountain range where its most famous tourist attraction, the Dedo de Deus, is located. 70% of its area is under environmental protection, most notabily the Serra dos Órgãos National Park.

Geography

Conservation
The municipality contains part of the Central Rio de Janeiro Atlantic Forest Mosaic, created in 2006.
It held 24% of the  Paraíso Ecological Station, created in 1987 and now integrated into the Três Picos State Park.
It contains 4% of the  Três Picos State Park, created in 2002.
It contains part of the  Bacia do Rio Macacu Environmental Protection Area, created in 2002.
The municipality contains the  Guapi-Guapiaçú Environmental Protection Area, created in 2004.
It contains 42% of the  Guanabara Ecological Station, created in 2006.

References

Guanabara Bay
municipalities in Rio de Janeiro (state)
populated coastal places in Rio de Janeiro (state)